The 2014–15 Rutgers Scarlet Knights women's basketball team will represent Rutgers University during the 2014–15 NCAA Division I women's basketball season. The Scarlet Knights, led by twentieth year head coach C. Vivian Stringer, play  their home games at the Louis Brown Athletic Center, better known as The RAC, as first year members of the Big Ten Conference. They finished the season 23–10, 12–6 in Big Ten play to finish in a tie for fourth place. They advanced to the quarterfinals of the Big Ten women's tournament where they lost to Northwestern. They received at-large to the NCAA women's tournament where they defeated Seton Hall in the first round before losing to the National Champions, Connecticut in the second round.

Roster

Schedule

|-
!colspan=9 style="background:#CC0000; color:#FFFFFF;"| Non-conference regular season

|-
!colspan=9 style="background:#CC0000; color:#FFFFFF;"| Big Ten regular season

|-
!colspan=9 style="background:#CC0000; color:#000000;"| Big Ten Women's Tournament

|-
!colspan=9 style="background:#CC0000; color:#000000;"| NCAA Women's Tournament

Rankings

See also
2014–15 Rutgers Scarlet Knights men's basketball team

References

Rutgers Scarlet Knights women's basketball seasons
Rutgers
R
Scarlet
Scarlet